The 2010 season was Club de Regatas Vasco da Gama's 112th year in existence, the club's 95th season in existence of football, and the club's 39th season playing in the Brasileirão Série A, the top flight of Brazilian football.

Players

Pre-season and friendlies

Competitions

Brasileirão Série A

Copa do Brasil

Rio de Janeiro State Championship

Statistics

Squad appearances and goals 
Last updated on 5 December 2010.

|-
! colspan=14 style=background:#dcdcdc; text-align:center|Goalkeepers

|-
! colspan=14 style=background:#dcdcdc; text-align:center|Defenders

|-
! colspan=14 style=background:#dcdcdc; text-align:center|Midfielders

|-
! colspan=14 style=background:#dcdcdc; text-align:center|Forwards

|}

Notes

References

External links 

CR Vasco da Gama
Club de Regatas Vasco da Gama seasons
Vasco da Gama